Lone Wolf is the forty-second studio album by American musician Hank Williams Jr. It was released by Warner Bros./Curb Records in January 1990. "Ain't Nobody's Business," "Good Friends, Good Whiskey, Good Lovin'" and "Man to Man" were released as singles. The album peaked at number 2 on the Billboard Top Country Albums chart and has been certified Gold by the RIAA.

"The U.S.A. Today" is a cover of a George Jones song from his 1987 album, Too Wild Too Long.

Track listing

Personnel

 Ava Aldridge – background vocals
 Eddie Bayers – drums
 Barry Beckett – keyboards
 Quitman Dennis – saxophone on "Almost Persuaded"
 Steve Gibson – banjo, electric guitar
 Dennis Good – trombone on "Hot to Trot"
 Sammy Hagar – electric guitar on "Almost Persuaded"
 Jack Hale – trombone on "Almost Persuaded"
 Mike Haynes – trumpet on "Almost Persuaded"
 Jim Horn – saxophone on "Hot to Trot" and "Almost Persuaded" 
 David Hungate – bass guitar
 Roy Huskey Jr. – upright bass
 John Barlow Jarvis – keyboards
 Mike Lawler – synthesizer
 "Cowboy" Eddie Long – steel guitar
 Donna McElroy – background vocals
 Jerry McKinney – saxophone
 Carl Marsh – fairlight programming
 Edgar Meyer – upright bass
 Jimmy C. Newman - lead vocals on "Big Mamou"
 Mark O'Connor – fiddle
 Michael Rhodes – bass guitar
 Cindy Richardson Walker – background vocals
 Matt Rollings – keyboards
 Jo-El Sonnier – accordion, French accordion
 George Tidwell – trumpet on "Hot to Trot"
 Wayne Turner – electric guitar
 Billy Joe Walker Jr. – acoustic guitar, electric guitar
 Hank Williams Jr. – lead vocals
 Reggie Young – electric guitar

Charts

Weekly charts

Year-end charts

References

1990 albums
Hank Williams Jr. albums
Warner Records albums
Curb Records albums
Albums produced by Barry Beckett
Albums produced by Jim Ed Norman